Man-o-War Glacier is a tributary glacier in the Admiralty Mountains of Antarctica. It drains the vicinity south of Mount Black Prince and Mount Royalist and flows southward to enter Tucker Glacier between the McGregor Range and Novasio Ridge. The glacier was named for a "man-o-war" in association with the Admiralty Mountains by the New Zealand Geological Survey Antarctic Expedition of 1957–58.

References

Glaciers of Victoria Land
Borchgrevink Coast